Gopal Swarup Pathak (26 February 1896 – 4 October 1982) was the fourth vice president of India from August 1969 to August 1974. He was the first Indian vice president not to succeed his superior as President.

Life

Born on 26 February 1896 at Bareilly in the North-Western Provinces, he studied law at Allahabad University .

He was the judge in Allahabad High Court 1945-46, member of Rajya Sabha 1960-66, Union Minister of Law 1966-67, Governor of Mysore state 1967-69 and Chancellor of Mysore University, Bangalore University and Karnataka University. Honored with "Proud Past Alumni" in the list of 42 members, from "Allahabad University Alumni Association", NCR, Ghaziabad (Greater Noida) Chapter 2007-2008 registered under society act 1860 with registration no. 407/2000.

He died on 4 October 1982. His son R. S. Pathak was Chief Justice of India and one of the four judges from India to have been on the International Court of Justice in The Hague (the others being Nagendra Singh who served as its President from 1985 to 1988, B. N. Rau (1952-1953), and Dalveer Bhandari since 2012).

References

External links 
 

|-

1896 births
1982 deaths
University of Allahabad alumni
Governors of Karnataka
Judges of the Allahabad High Court
People from Bareilly
Vice presidents of India
Rajya Sabha members from Uttar Pradesh
20th-century Indian judges
Law Ministers of India
Members of the Cabinet of India